Kul Marz Sofla (also Romanized as Kūl Marz Soflá) is a village in Nurabad Rural District, in the Central District of Delfan County, Lorestan Province, Iran. At the 2006 census, its population was 52, in 12 families.

References 

Towns and villages in Delfan County